Hillcrest General Hospital was opened around 1962 by a physician who "was chief of medicine there for 25 years." Hillcrest, a private hospital, was then sold to an investor, who leased it to Osteopathic Hospital and Clinic. Osteopathic previously had acquired another hospital  to which they subsequently relocated, and the 5-story building became St. Joseph's Hospital in 1985.

GHI owned Hillcrest during the Osteopathic period.

St. Joseph's Hospital
An April 2004 plan to "in the next year" close the hospital materialized sooner. St. Vincent Catholic Medical Centers had "run the hospital since 2000" and concluded it "sits near several other hospitals, so its closing may not have much effect on health care in the community." In 2007 the facility, after unsuccessful to at least provide services
"that do not require patients to stay overnight in the hospital" was repurposed for use by Cornerstone of Medical Arts Center Hospital, although the community was "particularly worried about drug-abuse and alcoholism patients being within a few blocks of" schools.

Osteopathic Hospital and Clinic 
Osteopathic Hospital and Clinic had their own locations prior to leasing Hillcrest's building, including one they bought in 1954.

References

  

Defunct hospitals in Queens
History of Queens, New York